United Nations Relief and Rehabilitation Administration (UNRRA) was an international relief agency, largely dominated by the United States but representing 44 nations. Founded in November 1943, it was dissolved in September 1948. it became part of the United Nations in 1945. Its purpose was to "plan, co-ordinate, administer or arrange for the administration of measures for the relief of victims of war in any area under the control of any of the United Nations through the provision of food, fuel, clothing, shelter and other basic necessities, medical and other essential services".
Its staff of civil servants included 12,000 people, with headquarters in New York. Funding came from many nations, and totalled $3.7 billion, of which the United States contributed $2.7 billion; Britain, $625 million; and Canada, $139 million.

UNRRA cooperated closely with dozens of volunteer charitable organizations, who sent hundreds of their own staff to work alongside UNRRA. In operation for only four years, the agency distributed about $4 billion worth of goods, food, medicine, tools, and farm implements at a time of severe global shortages and worldwide transportation difficulties. The recipient nations had been especially hard hit by starvation, dislocation, and political chaos. It played a major role in helping Displaced Persons return to their home countries in Europe in 1945–46.

Many of its functions were transferred to several UN agencies, including the International Refugee Organization and the World Health Organization. As an American relief project, it was later replaced by the Marshall Plan, which began operations in 1948. However, the historian Jessica Reinisch has shown that UNRRA should not just figure as a chapter in U.S. history. UNRRA's uniqueness was that it managed to bring together very different partners and models of international relief, each of which had their own history and antecedents.

Founding and authority 
The First World War displaced more refugees than in Europeans' living memory, first from Belgium in 1914, later in eastern Europe, cf. the civil wars and new national boundaries of 1917–19. Relief was undertaken largely by private charities, often American as organized by Herbert Hoover. The Second World War seemed likely to create still more refugees, prompting governments to act: U.S. President Franklin Delano Roosevelt proposed the agency in June 1943, to provide relief to areas liberated from Axis Powers when the fighting ended. Roosevelt had already obtained the approval of the United Kingdom, the Soviet Union, and China; he later obtained endorsements from 40 other governments to form the first "United Nations" organization.

The Agreement for United Nations Relief and Rehabilitation Administration founding document was signed by 44 countries in the White House in Washington on 9 November 1943. UNRRA was headed by a Director-General and governed by a Council (composed of representatives of all state parties) with a Central Committee representing the United States, Britain, China, and the Soviet Union. The other countries who signed the agreement included: Australia, Belgium, Bolivia, Brazil, Canada, Chile, Colombia, Costa Rica, Cuba, Czechoslovakia, Dominican Republic, Ecuador, Egypt, El Salvador, Ethiopia, the French Committee of National Liberation, Greece, Guatemala, Haiti, Honduras, Iceland, India, Iran, Iraq, Liberia, Luxembourg, Mexico, Netherlands, New Zealand, Nicaragua, Norway, Panama, Paraguay, Peru, Philippines, Poland, South Africa, Uruguay, Venezuela, and Yugoslavia.

Although the UNRRA was called a "United Nations" agency, it was established prior to the founding of the United Nations. The explanation for this is that the term "United Nations" was used at the time to refer to the Allies of World War II, having been originally coined for that purpose by Roosevelt in 1942.

Although initially restricted by its constitution to render aid only to nationals from the United Nations (the Allies), this was changed late in 1944, in response to pleas from Jewish organizations who were concerned with the fate of surviving Jews of German nationality, to also include "other persons who have been obliged to leave their country or place of origin or former residence or who have been deported therefrom by action of the enemy because of race, religion or activities in favor of the United Nations."

UNRRA operated in occupied Germany, primarily in camps for Displaced Persons, especially the 11,000,000 non-Germans who had been moved into Germany during the war, but did not render assistance to ethnic Germans.

In Asia, the organization provided assistance in the Dutch East Indies, Korea, and China (including Taiwan).

UNRRA Headquarters was in Washington, D.C., and the European Regional Office was set up in London. The organization was subject to the authority of the Supreme Headquarters of the Allied Expeditionary Forces (SHAEF) in Europe and was directed by three Americans during the four years of its existence. Its first director-general was Herbert Lehman (1 January 1944 to 31 March 1946), former governor of New York. He was succeeded by Fiorello La Guardia (1 April to 31 December 1946), former mayor of New York – who later learned that his sister, Gemma LaGuardia Gluck, and other relatives had been imprisoned in Nazi concentration camps. LaGuardia was, in turn, followed by Major General Lowell Ward Rooks (1 January 1947 to 30 September 1948).

Operations 
By 1947, UNRRA was running nearly 800 resettlement camps, housing over 700,000 people. Forty-four nations contributed to funding, supplying, and staffing the agency, of which the United States was the leading donor. The largest recipients of UNRRA commodity aid, in millions of US dollars were China, $518; Poland $478; Italy $418; Yugoslavia $416; Greece $347; Czechoslovakia $261; Ukraine (USSR) $188; and Austria $136. A number of academic assessments state that UNRRA was not perfect and was troubled by inefficiency, poor planning, shortages of supplies, and some incompetent personnel. On balance however, many argue that it was a major success in terms of delivering aid, food, and medicine, and helping Europe on the path to recovery, especially Eastern and Southern Europe.

See also 
 CARE
 CRALOG
 Chinese National Relief and Rehabilitation Administration
 GARIOA
 Heifers for Relief
 Seagoing cowboys

References

Films 
 U.N.R.R.A. presents In the Wake of the Armies ..., a 1944 National Film Board of Canada documentary about the U.N.R.R.A.
 The Search (Director: Fred Zinnemann, Starring: Montgomery Clift) 1948 Filmed in post-war Berlin: A story which brings to life UNRRA work in 1945 Germany.
 Sami swoi, 1967 - a Polish comedy on post-war peasant life, in which an UNRRA-delivered horse is an important action point.

Further reading 
 Armstrong-Reid, Susan E., and David Murray. Armies of Peace: Canada and the UNRRA Years (2008)
 Fox, Grace. "The Origins of UNRRA," Political Science Quarterly Vol. 65, No. 4 (Dec. 1950), pp. 561–584 in JSTOR
 Hitchcock, William I. The Bitter Road to Freedom: The Human Cost of Allied Victory in World War II Europe (2009) pp 215–48
 Reinisch, Jessica. "'We Shall Rebuild Anew a Powerful Nation': UNRRA, Internationalism and National Reconstruction in Poland," Journal of Contemporary History, July 2008, Vol. 43 Issue 3, pp 451–476, 
 Reinisch, Jessica. "Auntie UNRRA at the Crossroads" Past and Present, 2013, Vol. 218, Supplement 8, pp 70–97 https://doi.org/10.1093/pastj/gts035
 Reinisch, Jessica. "Internationalism in Relief: the Birth (and Death) of UNRRA" Past and Present, 2011, Vol. 210, Supplement 6, pp 258–289 https://doi.org/10.1093/pastj/gtq050
 Reinisch, Jessica. "Old wine in new bottles? UNRRA and the mid-century world of refugees", in: Frank, Matthew, and Jessica Reinisch (eds), Refugees in Europe, 1919-1959: A Forty Years' Crisis (Bloomsbury, 2017)
 Shephard, Ben. 'The Long Road Home: The Aftermath of the Second World War.' (Bodley Head, 2010)
  Woodbridge, George. UNRRA: the History of the United Nations Relief and Rehabilitation Administration (Columbia University Press, 1950), the official history
 Samuel Boussian, Mathias Gardet, Martine Ruchat : L'Internationale des républiques d'enfants, 2020, éd. Anamorasa,

External links 

 Records of the United Nations Relief and Rehabilitation Administration (UNRRA) (1943-1946) at the United Nations Archives
 A popular photograph collection at the UN Archives documents the work of the United Nations Relief and Rehabilitation Administration (UNRRA). The collection consists of 3,530 black and white photographs covering UNRRA activities in 28 countries across six continents. Select photographs of the collection are available on flickr.  XML Document
 Eisenhower's Thanksgiving Mission to Help Save UNRRA

 Organizations established in 1943
 Displaced persons camps in the aftermath of World War II
 United Nations organizations based in North America
 United Nations High Commissioner for Refugees
 United States and the United Nations